Gábor Kucsera (born 31 July 1949 – 20 April 2015) was a Hungarian swimmer. He competed in four events at the 1968 Summer Olympics.

References

1949 births
2015 deaths
Hungarian male swimmers
Olympic swimmers of Hungary
Swimmers at the 1968 Summer Olympics
Swimmers from Budapest
20th-century Hungarian people
21st-century Hungarian people